Bernard Barillot (born 4 October 1949 in Carcassonne, Aude), is a French painter and calligraphist.

Biography 
After high school in Carcassonne, he entered the Toulouse School of Fine arts in September 1967.
He studied under Claude Chaigneau and Jacques Fauché. He also attended Michel Goedgebuer 's lithography and silk screen printing art studio. 
He finished his studies in 1974 and was awarded the “Grand prix of the town of Toulouse”.

After much research, BB was busy with bind writing, calligraphy and painting.
Sign, Letter and Graphic became obsessional for him.
“The deep mysterious drawing of graphic signs and their powerful evocation draw attract and captivate the attention by means of sensitivity. The plan carries the image slowly, with the fragility of time passing space” writes Bernard Barillot in his book of artist “The song of the sign”.

As soon as he had finished at the School of Fine Arts, Bernard Barillot held multiple exhibitions, first in France and then abroad.
In 1984 Barillot took part in the exhibition “ L’abstraction au carré” (“the abstraction squared”) about the Larzac with Pierre Soulages, André Marfaing, Charles Pierre Bru, Albert Ayme, Jacques Fauché. He was then invited in residence with Kodama Maria Borges in Marrakech, April 1999. The creation of a first work followed:  “L’Ecriture hors limites” (“writing off limits”).

In 1999 he was the guest artist at the Book Fair of Bordeaux. On this occasion, the art critic Jean-Luc Chalumeau gave a conference in the Center of Contemporary Visual Arts (CAPC). He has just prefaced a catalog on his work, “Bernard Barillot, le devenir de l’oeuvre” (“Bernard Barillot, the future of the work”).
Two other works followed, the first prefaced by the art critic Gérard-Georges Lemaire.  The next one an artistic book entitled “The song of the sign”, entirely printed in 18 colour silk screen printing, with a poem by Serge Pey especially written for the artist “L’écriture qui ne se lit pas”, “The writing which is not read”

Several other writers, artists, journalists, write texts that accompany his works, Marie Didier, Jean Pierre Mader, Eric Carriere, Helen Ling, Alain Monnier, Marie Paule Peyronnet. Very early in June 2002, Bernard Barillot meets and presents his work to Pierre Restany, Campagne Première street in Paris, the art critic wishes to follow his approach that he finds interesting.

Unfortunately a second meeting would not take place, Pierre Restany dies practically one year later to the day. Very touched by all these texts, the artist will collect them surrounded by reproductions of some of his works of different formats, watercolors, pastels, acrylics, in a reasoned catalog so the publication will take place in spring 2019.

Bernard Barillot regularly shows his work in San Francisco in the United States.

Main events 
 1974 : Gallery DALBA2 in Toulouse
 1978 : Cultural centre of the town Toulouse
 1995 : Cultural centre Saint Jérôme in Toulouse
 1995 : Gallery Simone BOUDET in Toulouse
 1997 : Gallery Simone BOUDET in Toulouse
 1999 : Museum of Marrakech
 1999 : Book fair in Bordeaux
 2001 : Museum André ABBAL in Carbonne
 2006 : Abbey of Beaulieu in Ginals
 2007 : Church Saint-Étienne in Beaugency
 2009 : Gallery Tiny FACTORY in Toulouse
 2013 : Espace 3 in Sarlat-la-Canedat
 2013 : Gallery Tiny FACTORY in Toulouse
 2014 : Legal Office in Paris
 2015 : Calligraphy for the Stéphane Hessel high school in Toulouse
 2016 : Catholic Institute of Toulouse

Further reading 
Philippe Comte, OPUS international
Marc Herisse, La gazette de l’hôtel Drouot (« the gazette of Hotel Drouot »)
Gérard-Georges Lemaire, Verso arts et lettres (« Verso arts and letters »)
Gérard-Georges Lemaire, Revista
Marie-Paule Peyronnet, Arts et Métiers du livre (« Arts and Crafts of books »)
Madeleine Plaut,Acteurs graphiques (« graphic actors »)
Bernard Lescure, La dépêche du midi

Notes and references 

1949 births
Living people
People from Carcassonne
French calligraphers
20th-century French painters
21st-century French painters